Badra Ali Samake, known as Ali Samake (born 30 January 2000) is a Malian football player who plays for Lushnja in Kategoria e parë

Club career

Torino
He started playing for Torino's Under-19 squad in the 2017–18 season. He has not received any call-ups to the senior squad.

Loan to Lecco
He originally joined Lecco on loan in Serie D in January 2019. At the end of the 2018–19 season, Lecco was promoted to Serie C and the loan was renewed on 25 July 2019.

He made his professional Serie C debut for Lecco on 22 September 2019 in a game against Monza. He substituted Lorenzo Vignati in the 90th minute.

Loan to Chieri
On 4 January 2020, Torino terminated the loan to Lecco (where he only appeared in 2 league games since promotion to Serie C) and loaned him to Serie D club Chieri.

References

External links
 
 BADRA ALI SAMAKE Στατιστικά 2020-2021

2000 births
Living people
Malian footballers
Association football defenders
Torino F.C. players
Calcio Lecco 1912 players
Serie C players
Serie D players
Ayia Napa FC players
Cypriot Second Division players
Malian expatriate footballers
Expatriate footballers in Italy
Expatriate footballers in Cyprus
21st-century Malian people